The Union of Independent Italian Communists was a political party in Italy. The party was led by Donato Leone and Luigi Ardore. The party contested the Potenza-Matera constituency in the 1946 Constituent Assembly election. It obtained 1,776 votes (0.69% of the votes in the constituency). The list had three candidates; Donato Leone, Luigi Ardor and Antonio Ceglia.

References

Defunct communist parties in Italy